Herman Jacob Weber (born May 20, 1927) is a senior United States district judge of the United States District Court for the Southern District of Ohio.

Education and career

Born in Lima, Ohio, Weber was in the United States Navy just after World War II, from 1945 to 1946. He received a Bachelor of Arts degree from Otterbein University in 1949 and a Juris Doctor from the Ohio State University Moritz College of Law in 1952. He was in private practice in Fairborn, Ohio from 1952 to 1961. He was the Deputy Mayor of the Fairborn Mayor's Court from 1955 to 1957. He was a Fairborn Acting Municipal Judge (intermittently) from 1958 to 1960. He was a judge of the Common Pleas Court in Green County from 1961 to 1982. He was a judge of the Second District Court of Appeals from 1982 to 1985.

Federal judicial service

Weber was nominated by President Ronald Reagan on February 28, 1985, to the United States District Court for the Southern District of Ohio, to a new seat created by 98 Stat. 333. He was confirmed by the United States Senate on April 3, 1985, and received his commission on April 4, 1985. He assumed senior status on January 1, 2002.

References

Sources
 

1927 births
Living people
People from Fairborn, Ohio
Ohio state court judges
Judges of the United States District Court for the Southern District of Ohio
United States district court judges appointed by Ronald Reagan
20th-century American judges
Judges of the Ohio District Courts of Appeals
Otterbein University alumni
United States Navy sailors
Ohio State University Moritz College of Law alumni
21st-century American judges